Fairy Tale is the third studio album by Japanese recording artist Mai Kuraki. It was released on October 23, 2002 under Giza Studio label.

Background
The concept and theme of the album is "fairy tales". Considering that this would be the last album to be released in her teenage years, she has stated that she wanted it to reflect her beliefs, dreams and hopes in the past, present and for the future.

Release and promotion

Singles
"Can't Forget Your Love" was released as the lead single from the album in August 2001. "Can't Forget Your Love" was released as a double A-side with "Perfect Crime: Single Edit". The song was written by Kuraki, Aika Ohno, Cybersound and Akihito Tokunaga. It also served as the theme song to the 2001 Japanese TV program Ikiru tame no Jonetsu toshite no Satsujin. The single has sold over 180,040 copies and been certificated gold by RIAJ.

"Winter Bells" was released as the second single from the album in January 2002. "Winter Bells" was used as the tenth opening theme to the Case Closed anime. The song was written by Kuraki and Akihito Tokunaga. The song has sold over 258,310 copies and been certificated platinum by RIAJ. It's known as Kuraki's first Christmas song.

"Feel Fine!" was released as the third single from the album in April 2002. "Feel Fine!" samples 80's surf rock influences. The song was written by Kuraki and Akihito Tokunaga. The song has sold over 451,500 copies and been certificated 2×platinum by RIAJ, making it the sixteenth best-selling single of 2002 in Japan. It was served as the commercial song to the American cosmetic brand Sea Breeze.

"Like a Star in the Night" was released as the fourth single from the album in September 2002. "Like a Star in the Night" was used as the Japanese theme to the 2000 American television series Dark Angel. The song was written by Kuraki, Aika Ohno, Akihito Tokunaga and Daisuke Ikeda. The single has sold over 119,550 copies and been certificated gold by RIAJ.

Commercial performance
Fairy Tale debuted at number-one on the Oricon Weekly Albums Chart with 404,010 copies sold making it Kuraki's third number-one debut. The album stayed on the Oricon albums chart for a total of 37 weeks (twenty more than her previous album Perfect Crime) of which the album spent 5 in the top 10, non-consecutively. Fairy Tale was the 23rd best selling album of 2002.

Track listing

Charts

Daily charts

Weekly charts

Monthly charts

Yearly charts

Certification and sales

Cover
The composer of Key to my heart, Aika Ohno self-cover this song in her cover album Silent Passage.

References

External links 

2002 albums
Mai Kuraki albums
Being Inc. albums
Giza Studio albums
Japanese-language albums
Albums produced by Daiko Nagato